There are several 2016 UCI World Championships. The International Cycling Union (UCI) holds World Championships every year. For 2016, this includes:

 2016 UCI Road World Championships
 2016 UCI Track Cycling World Championships
 
 
 2016 UCI Mountain Bike & Trials World Championships
 
 2016 UCI Cyclo-cross World Championships
 2016 UCI BMX World Championships
 

UCI World Championships
UCI World Championships